Filipy may refer to the following places:
Filipy, Przasnysz County in Masovian Voivodeship (east-central Poland)
Filipy, Podlaskie Voivodeship (north-east Poland)
Filipy, Świętokrzyskie Voivodeship (south-central Poland)
Filipy, Węgrów County in Masovian Voivodeship (east-central Poland)